El Nuevo Tesoro de la Juventud (The New Treasure of Youth) is a general Spanish-language encyclopedia published by Grolier International, Inc.

Spanish encyclopedias
Mexican encyclopedias
1975 non-fiction books
20th-century encyclopedias